Anglès may refer to:

 Anglès, Tarn, France
 Anglès, Girona, Spain